The Magic Mountain (German: Der Zauberberg) is a 1982 drama film directed by Hans W. Geißendörfer and starring Christoph Eichhorn, Rod Steiger and Marie-France Pisier. An adaptation of Thomas Mann's 1924 novel The Magic Mountain, it was made as a co-production between Austria, Italy, France and West Germany.

It was shot at the Tempelhof Studios in Berlin and at a variety of locations, many of them in Switzerland. The sets were designed by the art directors Heidi Lüdi and Toni Lüdi.

Cast
 Christoph Eichhorn as Hans Castorp 
 Marie-France Pisier as Claudia Chauchat 
 Rod Steiger as Mynheer Peperkorn
 Charles Aznavour as Naphta 
 Flavio Bucci as Ludovico Settembrini 
 Hans Christian Blech as Hofrat Dr. Behrens 
 Alexander Radszun as Joachim Ziemssen 
 Margot Hielscher as Karoline Stöhr
 Gudrun Gabriel as Fräulein Marusja
 Irm Hermann as Fräulein Engelhart 
 Ann Zacharias as Fräulein Elly
 Rolf Zacher as Herr Wehsal 
 Kurt Raab as Dr. Edhin Krokowski
 Leslie Malton as Hermine Kleefeld
 Helmut Griem as James Tienappel

References

Bibliography
 Bock, Hans-Michael & Bergfelder, Tim. The Concise CineGraph. Encyclopedia of German Cinema. Berghahn Books, 2009.

External links

1982 films
1980s coming-of-age drama films
Films about tuberculosis
Films about philosophy
Films based on German novels
Films based on works by Thomas Mann
Films directed by Hans W. Geißendörfer
Films set in Switzerland
Films set in Hamburg
Films set in the 1900s
Films set in the 1910s
German coming-of-age drama films
1980s German-language films
German-language television shows
1980s German television miniseries
Films set in hospitals
West German films
Films scored by Jürgen Knieper
Films shot at Tempelhof Studios
1980s historical drama films
German historical drama films
United Artists films
Gaumont Film Company films
1980s German films